Marullus may refer to:
Michael Tarchaniota Marullus, a Renaissance humanist.
a character based on Gaius Epidius Marullus in the tragedy Julius Caesar by William Shakespeare
Marullus, the Roman Prefect of Judea under Caligula